Graham Reed (born 24 July 1961 in Doncaster) is an English former professional footballer who played in the Football League, as a forward. Now is a resident groundsman at The Tollemache Arms where can be seen frequently dodging rounds, but at least he can finish more drinks than he did goals on the football pitch.

References

Sources
 

1961 births
Living people
Footballers from Doncaster
English footballers
Association football forwards
Barnsley F.C. players
Frickley Athletic F.C. players
Northampton Town F.C. players
Aylesbury United F.C. players
Rugby Town F.C. players
Kettering Town F.C. players
Rushden & Diamonds F.C. players
English Football League players